The Nomlaki (also Noamlakee, Central Wintu, Nomelaki) are a Wintun people native to the area of the Sacramento Valley, extending westward to the Coast Range in Northern California. Today some Nomlaki people are enrolled in the federally recognized tribes: Round Valley Indian Tribes, Grindstone Indian Rancheria or the Paskenta Band of Nomlaki Indians. 
The Nomlaki were bordered by the Wintu (Wintun) in the north, the Yana in the northeast and east, the Konkow (Maiduan) in the east, the Patwin (Wintun) in the south, and the Yuki in the west.

Nomlaki groups

There are two main groups:

 The River Nomlaki lived in the Sacramento River region of the valley.
 The Hill Nomlaki lived west of the River Nomlaki.  Their territory is now within Glenn and Tehama counties and the River Nomlaki region.

The Nomlaki spoke a Wintuan language known as Nomlaki. It was not extensively documented, however, some recordings exist of speaker Andrew Freeman and Sylvester Simmons.

Population
Estimates for the pre-contact populations of most native groups in California have varied substantially. (See Population of Native California.) Alfred L. Kroeber (1925:883) put the combined 1770 population of the Nomlaki, Wintu, and Patwin at 12,000. Sherburne F. Cook (1976:180-181) estimated the combined population of the Nomlaki and northern Patwin as 8,000. Walter Goldschmidt (1978:341) thought that the pre-contact population of the Nomlaki was probably more than 2,000.

Kroeber estimated the population of the Nomlaki, Wintu, and Patwin in 1910 as 1,000.

Today
The US federal government restored the Paskenta Band of Nomlaki Indians to full tribal status in 1994.  They were able to acquire land, the Paskenta Rancheria, and establish the Rolling Hills Casino outside of Corning, California. Nomlaki people are also enrolled in the federally recognized Grindstone Indian Rancheria and Round Valley Indian Tribes.

See also

 Wintun
 Wintu
 Wintuan languages
 Wintu-Nomlaki traditional narratives

Notes

References
 Cook, Sherburne F. 1976a. The Conflict between the California Indian and White Civilization. University of California Press, Berkeley.
 Goldschmidt, Walter. 1978. "Nomlaki". In California, edited by Robert F. Heizer, pp. 341–349. Handbook of North American Indians, William C. Sturtevant, general editor, vol. 8. Smithsonian Institution, Washington, D.C.
 Goldschmidt, Walter Rochs. Nomlaki Ethnography. Berkeley: University of California Press, 1951. 
 Kroeber, A. L. 1925. Handbook of the Indians of California. Bureau of American Ethnology Bulletin No. 78. Washington, D.C.
 Mithun, Marianne. 1999. The Languages of Native North America. Cambridge University Press.  (hbk); .
 Smythe, Charles W., and Priya Helweg. Summary of Ethnological Objects in the National Museum of Natural History Associated with the Nomlaki Culture. Washington, D.C.: Repatriation Office, National Museum of Natural History, Smithsonian Institution, 1996.
 A closely related Wintun dialect directly north of the Nomlaki, the Wintu

External links
 Native Tribes, Groups, Language Families and Dialects of California in 1770 (map after Kroeber), California Pre-History
 Nomlaki language overview at the Survey of California and Other Indian Languages

Wintun
Native American tribes in California